Eat Me may refer to:

Films
 Eat Me! (2000 film), a comedy film
 Eat Me! (2009 film), a horror comedy film
 Eat Me (2018 film), a film featuring Brad Carter

Literature
 "Eat Me", a story by Robert R. McCammon that received the Bram Stoker Award for Best Short Story
 "Eat Me", a poem by Patience Agbabi
 "EAT ME", a phrase written on a cake in Alice in Wonderland

Music
 "Eat Me", a song by Arkarna from Fresh Meat
 "Eat Me", a song by Ozzy Osbourne from Ordinary Man
 "Eat Me", a song by Demi Lovato (featuring Royal & the Serpent) from Holy Fvck

Television
 "Eat Me" (Farscape episode)

Other uses

See also
Drink Me (disambiguation)
Eat Me, Drink Me, an album by Marilyn Manson